Stepachyovo is a rural locality (a village) in Zalesskoye Rural Settlement, Ustyuzhensky District, Vologda Oblast, Russia. The population was 258 as of 2002. There are 5 streets.

Geography 
Kvashnino is the nearest rural locality.

References 

Rural localities in Ustyuzhensky District